Theodore Soderberg may refer to:

 Theodore Soderberg (1890–1971), American sound engineer
 Theodore Soderberg (1923–2012), American sound engineer